Adolfo Carlos Aguilar Villanueva (born 1 October 1972) is a Peruvian actor, TV presenter and producer. He is best known for hosts the programs Polizontes, Trato Hecho, El último pasajero and since 2012 Yo Soy.

Life and career 
He was born in 1972, in the province of Callao. He also took acting classes with Eduardo Masias (Talent Workshop Productions of America), Roberto Ángeles, Alberto Isola, Edgar Saba and James Martin.

Actor 
In 1998, he began his television career in the telenovela La rica Vicky, where he shared roles with Ismael La Rosa, Virna Flores and Alexandra Graña. Then came more productions including Gente como uno and Milagros.

In theater, Aguilar participated in the Commedia dell'arte Los chismes de las mujeres of Carlo Goldoni in 2000. He later joined the cast of the drama Criados en cautiverio directed by Carlos Acosta. Then came the comedy Salvador written by Peruvian humorist Nicolás Yerovi. Then he joined the ranks of the theater group Teatro DeAbril with whom puts the drama Ivonne, Princesa de Borgoña of Witold Gombrowicz. That same year, he starred in the comedy Dicky & Pussy, se aman locamente was written and directed by Jaime Nieto, a work which was subsequently presented in Miami theaters. Then came Deseos Ocultos written and directed by Jaime Nieto, work that by the nature of the character of Adolfo (Santiago), makes him a sexual icon. He then joined "Preludio Asociación Cultural" with the drama Sacco and Vanzetti of Mauricio Kartun, where did the character of Lieutenant James Stewart, thanks to a report on the cause, is in charge of locking Sacco and Vanzetti for a crime they did not commit.

In 2006 he portrayed Él in the drama Los ojos abiertos de ella, where he shared roles with the leading lady of Italian origin Attilia Boschetti. Then came the comedy El enfermo imaginario by Moliere, where he completed two totally opposite characters: Tomas Descompuestus (young and handsome boyfriend of the daughter of Argan) and Mr. Florido (dirty old apothecary of the time) directed by Ruth Escudero. Towards the end of that year, he premiered the drama Death of a Salesman of Arthur Miller in the CCPUC (cultural center Catholic University of Peru), where did the character of Uncle Ben.

In 2008, while in Miami, he performed in Quin's Day, short film participating in 48 Hour Film Festival.

He also participated in the film El Buen Pedro of Sandro Ventura, premiered in 2012.

Presenter
In 2002, Aguilar hosts Otra cosa, a magazine program on RTP channel state. During 2003–2004 was presenter/reporter Polizontes program, in Antena3 (after Plus TV). In 2005 he signed as exclusive artist ATV, where he hosts the competition program Trato Hecho. Aguilar was elected by the newspaper Peru21 as "Best Host of the Year".

In 2006 he briefly hosts the contest juvenile court program Con Buena Onda.

In August 2010 he returned to Peru, after a long stay in Miami, to compete in the dance reality show El Gran Show (second season), hosted by Gisela Valcárcel.

The Peruvian version of the TV game-show El último pasajero, premiered on 21 March 2011 on Frecuencia Latina, with Aguilar as the presenter. The show won the Premio a la excelencia ANDA in 2012 as Best TV Show of 2011.

From the 9 April 2012 is the host of the reality show Yo Soy on Frecuencia Latina. The show will be continued in 2013.

Producer 
Aguilar, along with film director Sandro Ventura, Hugo Shinki and Jesus Alvarez, formed the production company Big Bang Films, which has produced El buen Pedro, released in September 2012, and Quizás mañana, released in February 2013. He is credited as executive producer. The third film producer will be Japy Ending (2014).

Filmography

References

External links

20th-century Peruvian male actors
Living people
1972 births
21st-century Peruvian male actors